The Harrier LR9C is a purpose-built grand tourer-style race car, designed by British engineer Lester Ray, and tuned by German tuning company Freisinger; specially developed and built to the GT2 (and later GT1) rules and regulations of the British GT Championship, in 1994.

References

Grand tourer racing cars